is a brackish lake near Nemuro in Hokkaidō, Japan. The wetlands of Lake Furen and the  dunes have been designated a Ramsar Site.

See also
Ramsar Sites in Japan

References

Furen
Ramsar sites in Japan